The Rife House was a historic house at 1515 South Eighth Street in Rogers, Arkansas.  It was a modest single-story house, built out of concrete blocks cast to resemble rusticated stone.  It had a gable-on-hip roof, with a shed-roof extension to the rear, and a full-width porch across the front.  The porch was supported by four fluted columns fashioned out of concrete blocks.  Built c. 1920, this was a local example of a vernacular house built using a once-popular construction material.

The house was listed on the National Register of Historic Places in 1988, but has since been destroyed.

See also
National Register of Historic Places listings in Benton County, Arkansas

References

Houses on the National Register of Historic Places in Arkansas
Houses completed in 1920
Houses in Rogers, Arkansas
National Register of Historic Places in Benton County, Arkansas